Thazhakkara is a village in Alappuzha district in the Indian state of Kerala. Thazhakkara is one among the five Villages in Mavelikkara Taluk in Alappuzha District. Justice C.T.Ravikumar, Judge of Supreme Court of India is a native of Thazhakara.

Demographics
 India census, Thazhakkara had a population of 35,126 with 16,780 males and 18,346 females.

Economy
Some of the industries based in Thazhakkara are:
Travancore Oxygen (near Kunnam)
Sangrose Laboratories (in Mavelikkara), which specialises in the manufacture of soft-gelatin capsules. It is also one of the only companies in the world to manufacture clofazimine.
SCC ready mix concrete ( Industrial estate)

Local Self Government

Thazhakkara PanchayatThazhakara Panchayat has 21 wards. They are Thazhakara A, Thazhakara B, Vazhuvadi, Kunnam,Kunnam H.S, Kochalummoode, Mankamkuzhi Town, Erattapallikoodam,Kallimel,  Vettiyar,  Vettiyar HS,  Kottemala,  Thannikunnu,  Parakulangara,  Eravankara,Murivayikkara, Arunoottimangalam, PHC Ward,Seed Farm, Kallumala and Aakkanattukara. ThazhakkaraPanchayat is situated between latitude of 9º14" north and a longitude of 76º33" east,at the south-east part in Alappuzha District. The local people havetwo opinions about the history of the name as Thazhakkara. When all these placeswere  under  the  majestic  rule  of  Edappally  Swaraoopam,  this  place  was  seen  as‘Thalakkara’ since this area was at the top level socially, economically, educationally,culturally and geographically and later it became ‘Thazhakkara’.

Notables   

 Justice C. T.Ravikumar, Judge Supreme Court of India

References
https://shodhganga.inflibnet.ac.in/bitstream/10603/19678/8/08_chapter1.pdf

Villages in Alappuzha district